Och Aye the G'nu is a 2017 children's album credited to Australian singer-songwriter, Jimmy Barnes and the Wiggles. It was first mentioned by Anthony Field in the Wiggles' 25th anniversary feature interview. The album was released in March 2017 and peaked at number 34 on the ARIA Charts.

At the ARIA Music Awards of 2017, the album won the ARIA Award for Best Children's Album.

A music video of the lead track I'm a G'Nu, which is not to be confused with the Flanders and Swan song "The Gnu", was created by ABC for Kids and uploaded on their YouTube channel.

Background and release
Jimmy Barnes is a Scottish-born rock singer–songwriter. His career as a solo performer and the lead vocalist of Cold Chisel has made him one of the most successful and distinctive artists in Australian music history. Barnes has sold over 12 million albums and has been inducted into the ARIA Hall of Fame twice. In 2016 he published his bestselling memoir, Working Class Boy. Och Aye the G'nu is his first album of children's music.
 
The Wiggles have celebrated 25 years in the entertainment industry. They have sold over 23 million DVDs, 7 million albums and 8 million books. The Wiggles have been inducted into the ARIA Hall of Fame.

Upon release, Barnes said "It has been such an honour and a pleasure to work with my old friends... 'Och Aye the G'nu' was written for my grandchildren, especially my cheeky little red headed Scot. Glasgow holds a special place in my heart and it was also inspired by my love of Scotland."

After working on the project, producer Anthony Field said; "The songs on Och Aye the G'nu are absolutely beautiful, they come from Jimmy's heart. There's also a great sense of fun, perfect for the young listener. Every morning we'd come into the studio and be so excited, we knew we were working on a very special project for children. It was one of the greatest experiences working with Jimmy."

Track listing
 "I'm a G'Nu"  (Introduction)  - 0:13
 "I'm a G'Nu" (Jackie Barnes, Jimmy Barnes, Anthony Field, Lachlan Gillespie) - 1:49
 "Och Aye G'Nu and Kangaroo"  (Introduction)  - 0:09
 "Och Aye G'Nu and Kangaroo" (Jackie Barnes, Jimmy Barnes, Anthony Field, Lachlan Gillespie) - 1:46
 "When You're Living in the Zoo"  (Introduction)  - 0:25
 "When You're Living in the Zoo" (Jackie Barnes, Jimmy Barnes, Anthony Field, Lachlan Gillespie) - 1:46
 "Winter is Coming Here Soon"  (Introduction)  - 0:15
 "Winter is Coming Here Soon" (Jimmy Barnes, Anthony Field, Lachlan Gillespie) - 2:40
 "I Got New Shoes"  (Introduction)  - 0:12
 "I Got New Shoes" (Jackie Barnes, Jimmy Barnes, Anthony Field) - 1:47
 "Shake Your Shaggy, Shaggy Mane"  (Introduction)  - 0:10
 "Shake Your Shaggy, Shaggy Mane" (John Field) - 1:58
 "Two Pairs of Shoes"  (Introduction)  - 0:12
 "Two Pairs of Shoes"  (Jackie Barnes, Jimmy Barnes, Anthony Field, John Field) - 1:31
 "The Haggis is Coming"  (Introduction to We Love Haggis)  (Jimmy Barnes, Anthony Field) - 0:16
 "We Love Haggis, Stew and Shortbread Too!" (Jackie Barnes, Jimmy Barnes, Anthony Field, Paul Field) - 1:34
 "The Blackbird Ballet"  (Introduction)  - 0:09
 "The Blackbird Ballet" (Jimmy Barnes, Anthony Field, John Field) - 1:18
 "I'll Be With You Forever"  (Introduction)  - 0:08
 "I'll Be With You Forever" (Jackie Barnes, Jimmy Barnes, Anthony Field) - 4:06
 "My G'Nu Kazoo"  (Introduction)  - 0:09
 "My G'Nu Kazoo" (Jackie Barnes, Jimmy Barnes, Anthony Field, John Field, Lachlan Gillespie) - 0:43
 "It's a Parrot Party"  (Introduction) - 0:10
 "It's a Parrot Party" (Jimmy Barnes, Murray Cook, Jeff Fatt, Anthony Field, Greg Page) - 2:09
 "The Fairy Dance"  (Introduction)  - 0:16
 "The Fairy Dance"  (Instrumental)  (Jackie Barnes, Jimmy Barnes, Oliver Brian, Anthony Field, Alex Keller) - 1:25
 "Tip Toe in the Snow"  (Introduction)  - 0:13
 "Tip Toe in the Snow" (Jackie Barnes, Emma Watkins) - 0:46
 "Outro" - 0:14

Personnel

Musicians
 Vocals: Elly May Barnes, Jane Barnes, Jimmy Barnes, Mahalia Barnes, Maria Field, Lachlan Gillespie, Emma Watkins
 Backing Vocals: Elly May Barnes, Jackie Barnes, Jane Barnes, Jimmy Barnes, Mahalia Barnes, John Field, Paul Field, Lachlan Gillespie, Emma Watkins
 Acoustic Guitar: Oliver Brian, Anthony Field, John Field
 Bass Guitar: Jeff McCormack
 Piano: Jackie Barnes, Jeff Fatt, Lachlan Gillespie
 Jaw Harp: Jackie Barnes
 Glockenspiel: Jackie Barnes
 Drums: Jackie Barnes, Ian Bentley, Anthony Field, Kenny Holmes
 Percussion: Jackie Barnes, Oliver Brian, Anthony Field
 Bagpipes: Anthony Field, Michael McDaniel, Robert Pearce
 Organ: Jackie Barnes, Jeff Fatt, Lachlan Gillespie
 Six-String Banjo: Oliver Brian, Anthony Field
 Tambourine: Jackie Barnes
 Electric Guitar: Oliver Brian, Anthony Field
 Elephant: Simon Pryce
 Didgeridoo: Anthony Field
 Marching Drums: Ian Bentley, Kenny Holmes
 Electric Bagpipes: Anthony Field
 Ukulele: John Field
 Nylon Guitar: Oliver Brian
 Tin Whistle: Anthony Field
 Bells: Jackie Barnes
 Kazoo: Jackie Barnes, Lachlan Gillespie

Staff
 Created and Performed by: Jimmy Barnes
 Music Produced by: Anthony Field
 Music Recorded at: Hot Potato Studios, Sydney
 Music Recorded by: Alex Keller and Jeff McCormack
 Music Mixed by: Alex Keller
 Executive Producer: Paul Field
 Production Managers: Kate Chiodo and Ivy Gaymer
 Graphic Design: Daniel Attard
 Stills Photographers: Daniel Attard and Paul Field

Charts

Release history

References

2017 albums
Jimmy Barnes albums
ARIA Award-winning albums
Children's music albums